Hista hegemon is a moth in the Castniidae family. It is found in south-eastern Brazil.

The length of the forewings is 39 mm for males and 53 mm for females. The maculae on the forewings are slightly darker than the ground colour. There are light yellow hues medially on the hindwings, with two extradiscal spotbands fused at the tornus forming a v-shape which is positioned horizontally. Adults are sexually dimorphic.

Subspecies
Hista hegemon hegemon (Brazil)
Hista hegemon menetriesi (Boisduval, [1875]) (Brazil)
Hista hegemon variegata (Rothschild, 1919) (Brazil: Santa Catarina)

Etymology
The specific epithet is derived from the Greek word hegemon (meaning "leader").

References

 ; ;  2010: Revision of Hista Oiticica (Lepidoptera: Castniidae) and discussion on the validity of its subspecies. Zootaxa, 2421: 1–27. Preview

Moths described in 1839
Castniidae